Kotyaevka (Kotiaevka) is a small village situated on the right bank of the Kigash River in the Kurmangazy District of Atyrau Region, Kazakhstan. Geographical coordinates are: Latitude (DMS): 46° 32' 40 N, Longitude (DMS): 48° 45' 20 E.

It is located in 30 kilometers from Ganyushkino, administrative centre of Kurmangazy district. Kotyaevka is situated on the Kazakhstan's western border with Russia.

From October 2007 Kurmangazy single check-point has started to operate for all those crossing Kazakhstani-Russian border. The opening ceremony of the check point was held in September 2007 and was attended by Russian Prime Minister Viktor Zubkov and his Kazakh counterpart Karim Massimov.

Sources 
KazIndex, Atyrau Province Book
Government of Kazakhstan website

Populated places in Atyrau Region